Sahitya Akademi Translation Prizes are given each year to writers for their outstanding translations work in the 24 languages, since 1989.

Recipients 
Following is the list of recipients of Sahitya Akademi translation prizes for their works written in Urdu language. The award, as of 2019, consisted of 50,000.

See also 
 List of Sahitya Akademi Award winners for Urdu

References

External links 
 Akademi Translation Prizes For Urdu language

Sahitya Akademi Prize for Translation
Indian literary awards